The Hurricane Gulch Bridge is a  long steel arch railroad bridge that crosses Hurricane Gulch, Alaska. It is located at milepost 284.2, counting from Seward. At 296 ft above the Hurricane creek, it is both the longest and tallest bridge on the entire Alaska Railroad. Many of Alaska Railroad's passenger routes pass over this bridge, including the Denali Star, the Aurora Winter and the flag-stop Hurricane Turn, in addition to freight routes.

A road bridge by the same name also exists.

Construction
Construction of this bridge by the American Bridge Company began in early 1921. The first steel was erected in June, and the first passenger train operated on August 15 of the same year. It was the most difficult and expensive bridge project on the railroad, and cost $1.2 million. To build it, the company strung an aerial tram across the gulch, and construction proceeded from both sides simultaneously. For eight years, this was the tallest bridge in the US.

See also
 List of bridges in the United States by height

References

1921 establishments in Alaska
1921 establishments in the United States
Alaska Railroad
Bridges completed in 1921
Buildings and structures in Matanuska-Susitna Borough, Alaska
Railroad bridges in Alaska
Open-spandrel deck arch bridges in the United States
Steel bridges in the United States